Kula Deivam is an Indian Tamil-language soap opera which is directed by Thirumurugan and starring T. S. B. K. Moulee, Vadivukkarasi and Srithika. It was broadcast on Sun TV on Monday to Saturday from 11 May 2015 to 13 April 2018 for 897 Episodes. The show started to re-telecast on Kalaignar TV from 5 September 2022 Monday to Saturday 11:30AM–12:00PM

Synopsis 
It follows the story of the couple Sundram and Gnanambal (T. S. B. K. Moulee & Vadivukkarasi) who stays together with their children and grandchildren. Problems arise in their close-knit family when the different generations clash with each other.

Cast

Main
 T. S. B. K. Moulee as Sundaram/Arunachalam
 Vadivukkarasi as Gnanambal Sundaram
 Srithika as Alamelu Sundaram 
Sharvan Rajesh as Rajesh

Supporting
 Revathy Shankar as Mangaleshwari
 Raghavan Durairaj as Karunakaran 
 Karthi as Mahendran
 Parthi as Boopalan
 Aravamudhan as Augustine
 Sateesh Kumar as Keshav Arunachalam
 Rani as Aarti Keshav
 Shanthi as Mangalasundari Karunakaran
 Surjith Ansary as Amudhan Doraipaandi
 Sangavi as Kayalvizhi Karunakaran, Harshan’s ex-wife
 Bavithran as Rohit Keshav, Keshav’s son
 Sreepriya Ilayaraj as Keerthy Rohit, Rohit’s late wife
 Hema Rajkumar as Shobana
 R.J Shoba as Nimmu alias Nirmala Doraipaandi 
 Venkat as Nathan
 Raja Sekhar as Peter, Augustine Father
 Vara Lakshmi as Esther, Augustine Mother
 VJ Sasikala Nagarajan as Seetha
 Giridhar Thirumalachary as Sivagiri
 Kannan as Niranjan
 Ashok Kumar as Daas
 Ganesh Babu as Doraipaandi
 Rajkanth as Inspector Ranjith 
 Ganesh SD as 'Fresh' Praveen
 Sreedharan Gopalan as Harshan, Kayalvizhi’s ex-husband
 Aishwarya Ramsai as Ananya Keshav
 Madhumitha Illayaraja as Velvizhi Karunakaran
 Geetha as Kodeeswari
 Ishitha as ips Shenbaga (assistant commissioner of police) 
 Kavya as Sudha
 Yazar as Vetrivel
 Kaviya as Shreya Siddharthh
 Dacutt as Siddharth
 Ashwin Kumar as Arjun

Production

Speaking about the series, director Thirumurugan said, "Unlike Nadhaswaram, which was entirely shot in a small village, Kula Deivam will have a city connect. There are two families -one is in the rural areas and the other is from the city. How these two families function differently is the main plot of this mega series. I have also sketched characters from three different generations. How they connect with each other is also one of the plots."

Original soundtrack

Title song
It was written by lyricist Palani Bharathi, composed by music director Sanjeev Rathan, and was sung by Anand, Anitha Karthikeyan.

Soundtrack

Ratings
According to BARC ratings (Tamil Nadu + Puducherry)' Mega Serial household television ratings, the pilot episode week of That's Kula Deivam earned a averaging 13.8% rating. While the final episode week scored an 8.5% rating. It became one of the most watched tamil television program. In week 42 of 2017 and the following week, it was at fifth and fourth position.

Awards and nominations

International broadcast
The series was released on 11 May 2015 on Sun TV, the series also airs on Sun TV HD. The Show was also broadcast internationally on Channel's international distribution. It airs in Sri Lanka, Singapore, Malaysia, South East Asia, Middle East, United States, Canada, Europe, Oceania, South Africa and Sub Saharan Africa on Sun TV. The show's episodes were released on YouTube channel as Thiru TV and also airs in Sri Lanka Tamil Channel on Shakthi TV.

 In Sri Lanka Tamil Channel on Shakthi TV with Sinhala subtitles. The series premiered on 27 July 2014. It aired Monday through Friday at 11:30Am SST.

See also
 List of programs broadcast by Sun TV

References

External links
 Official Website 

Sun TV original programming
2010s Tamil-language television series
2015 Tamil-language television series debuts
Tamil-language television shows
2018 Tamil-language television series endings